Daniel Ray Allen Cooksey Jr. (born November 2, 1975) is an American actor and musician. He is best known for his roles in television shows, such as Diff'rent Strokes (during the final three seasons), The Cavanaughs, Xiaolin Showdown, and Salute Your Shorts, for providing the voice of Montana "Monty" Max in Tiny Toon Adventures, and for his role as a friend to the young John Connor in Terminator 2: Judgment Day.

Early life
Cooksey was born in Moore, Oklahoma, the son of Melody Ann (née Wagoner) and Daniel Ray Allen Cooksey.

Filmography

References

External links
 
 Arbuckle (current band) MySpace

1975 births
21st-century American singers
21st-century American male singers
Living people
American child singers
American male child actors
American male film actors
American male television actors
American male voice actors
Male actors from Oklahoma
People from Moore, Oklahoma